Lebohang Kganye (born in 1990, Katlehong) is a South African visual artist living and working in Johannesburg. Working primarily with photography, Lebohang Kganye incorporates sculpture, performance, installation and film in her creative practice. Kganye explores what she defines as "fictional history" by merging archival elements and characters drawn from her family stories, theatre and literature into imaginary sceneries. Kganye is part of a new generation of contemporary South African artists and photographers born shortly before or after Apartheid ended.

Biography 

Lebohang Kganye was born in Johannesburg and grew up in Katlehong, a township in South Africa. She started her photography training at the Market Photo Workshop in Johannesburg in 2009, completing its Advanced Photography Programme in 2011. Kganye received her diploma in Fine Arts from the University of Johannesburg in 2016. She is currently working on a Masters in Fine Arts at the Witwatersrand University.

Career and work 

Lebohang Kganye lost her mother when she was twenty years old. Her mother was her main connection to her extended family. A few years later, after she had completed her studies at the Market Photo Workshop, Kganye started to explore her family stories by looking into old photo albums and recording oral stories narrated by her family members. Through cross-dressing and performance, Kganye attempts to recreate moments in her family history she had not herself experienced. Her work aims to juxtapose different temporalities and transform photography as a meeting place between generations. Roland Barthes’ eulogy to his late mother and reading of photography as overlapping past and present in Camera Lucida inspired Kganye’s practice.

The spelling of Kganye's surname is another component of the artist's work. The apartheid regime forced black South African families to move to designated areas away from city centres. Black South African surnames were often recorded incorrectly or misspelt by law officials. The spelling of Kganye's surname changed from Khanye to Khanyi, and eventually, Kganye. As Kganye explains, by revisiting her family journey, she discovered that identity could not be traced: "it is an invention, constructed of true, half-true and untrue narratives, hopes, dreams and fears". Kganye's practice incorporates animated films, installations and large-scale sculpted papers and cut-outs as ways to re-experience the past and question the fabricated nature of history and memory. As the artist explains: "a large part of history and memory is in fact fantasy."

Photography 

Lebohang Kganye's work deploys photography, self-portraiture and archives to engage notions of affiliations, memory and fiction. The artist explores history by creating imaginative sceneries where real and fictional characters coexist.

In B(l)ack to Fairy Tales (2011), created during her studies at the Market Photo Workshop, Kganye stages scenes drawn from The German Grimm Brothers fairy tales and Disney. As the artist writes: "As a girl, I identified with fairy tale characters such as Snow White. Our annual primary school plays were about fairy tales, and I’d say, I’m Snow White and want to be her. My black skin and location became an increasing disjuncture with the fantasies I believed in." Covering her body with black paint and dressed in childhood inspired outfits, she attempts to stress the disjunction between her childhood fantasies and experience growing up in black South African townships.

Kganye was the recipient of The Tierney Fellowship in 2012 and exhibited Her-Story and Heir-Story, two photographic series combined under the overall title "Ke Lefa Laka" ("It’s my inheritance,” in Sesotho) at the Market Photo Workshop. Working under the mentorship of the visual artist Mary Sibande and curator Nontobeko Ntombela, Kganye explores her family story through re-performance, digital juxtapositions and photocollages. Her-Story, explains Kganye, is a way to "reconnect" with her late mother. Using pictures of her late mother found in old family albums as a reference, Kganye dresses up with her mother's clothes, adopts her mothers' poses and is photographed by her sister in the exact locations displayed in the original snapshots. She then digitally juxtaposes her contemporary images to her mother's. This series of double exposures attempts to annihilate differences between the present and the past . As the artist explains, in Her-Story, she "(her mother) is me, I am her. There remains in this commonality so much difference, and so much distance in space and time. Photographs present us not just with the “thereness” of the object but the “having been there,” thus having the ability to present past, present, and future in a single image." Ke Lefa Laka (2013) was awarded the Jury Prize at the Bamako Encounters Biennale of African Photography in 2015 and the Contemporary African Photography (CAP) Prize in 2016.

Cuttings 

Besides the artist's family story, Lebohang Kganye's work explores the political and economic history of South Africa.

In Heir-Story (2013), Kganye unpacks her family's journey of migration during apartheid. As Kganye explains: “The project evolves around how my family landed in Johannesburg – how they ended up in the city from the farmlands. But it’s really a relatable story. There are stories of migration from around the world. It’s not a foreign story.”  Heir-Story focuses on Kganye's grandfather. Dressed in his suit, a typical garment in her family photographs, and stepping into his shoes, Kganye places herself in an installation made of large-size cardboard cut-outs of enlarged photos from her old family albums. Kganye never met her grandfather who died before she was born. Heir-Story, the artist writes, allows her to “enact these stories to construct a visual narrative, in which we (her grandfather and herself) meet”. In a series of six scenes, Kganye revisits her grandfather's displacement during the apartheid era. He was the first member of the family to move from the farmlands of the Orange Free State to Transvaal. Kganye recorded stories narrated by her family members to help her recreate each scene. As she explains: “I’m reimagining the scenes through what I’ve been told.”  Kganye is the only figure shot in colour. She photographs herself interacting with life-size black and white flat-mannequins of the characters related to her in family stories and photo albums, and in doing so, creates a juxtaposition between the present and the past. Heir-Story was exhibited together with the series Her-Story in the exhibition Ke Lefa Laka at the Market Photo Worksop.

Kganye experiments with installation and sculpture. Her grandfather, the central patriarchal figure in her family, is a recurrent character in her creative practice. In Reconstruction of a Family (2016), she borrows archival elements from her photo albums to construct enlarged cardboard cut-outs. She inserts black silhouettes of characters from her family photo albums into a human-scale white box and places her grandfather at the centre of the stage. Reconstruction of a Family focuses on the family story of Kganye's mother, their successive displacements during the apartheid era and their creation of temporary homes across the country. As Kganye explains: “A big difference compared to my previous series on this same process is that the characters here are reversed—the background is white, the silhouettes are black. The characters no longer have faces. They become anonymous.” By placing figures from different generations in the same scene, Kganye engages the theme of memory and death.

From 2016-onwards, Lebohang Kganye produces the series titled Dirithi. Using the family album as a primary material, Kganye selects family figures and transforms their photographic representations into anonymous and enigmatic silhouettes. Dirithi, as Kganye explains, evokes the passing of family figures and stresses the capacity of photography to act as a bridge between the dead and the living. According to the artist: “photography is a ghost, an existence in transition, hovering in a duality of time. Silhouettes resonate with me because of this play".

Theatrics 

Lebohang Kganye's practice engages theatre and literature. In her series Tell Tale (2018), she stages the stories of the villagers narrated in Athol Fugard’s play Road to Mecca and Lauren Beukes’ book Maverick. Placing silhouette cut-outs of characters in miniature theatre sets, Kganye figures her own interpretation of the tales. As she writes: “Tell Tale confronts the conflicting stories, which are told in multiple ways, even by the same person – a combination of memory and fantasy. The work does not attest to being a documentation of a people but presents their personal narratives, which they share over a cup of tea, homemade ginger ale or the locally brewed beer.” Tell Tale (2018) presents villagers interacting with ordinary objects, their “prized possessions”. In these theatre sets, Kganye attempts to highlight the capacity of oral stories to pass from one generation to the next and “perform ideals of a community”.

Animation 

Lebohang Kganye has been working with films, animating the life-size flat-mannequins of characters taken from her family albums with light and shadows. In 2014, Lebohang Kganye turns her series Heir-Story (2013) into the animated film Pied Piper's Voyage. In 2017, she animates her series Reconstruction of a Family (2016) in the film Ke Sale Teng. The medium of film is a way for the artist further to explore the fluctuating character of memory and history. As she explains: “Through the use of silhouette cutouts of family members and other props in a diorama, the film confronts the conflicting stories, which are told in multiple ways, even by the same person.” In Pied Piper's Voyage (2014) and Ke Sale Teng (2017), Kganye explores the malleability of oral narratives.

Installation 

Kganye works with a variety of medium and scales, alternating between life-size and monumental installations. The installation Mohlokomedi wa Tora (“lighthouse keeper”) in 2018 presents the story of her grandfather in life-size sceneries made of cardboards and cut-outs standing up in the exhibition space. Organising archival elements around a light positioned in the centre of the room, the artist creates a shadow play theatre and invites visitors to walk in and interact with each scene. Kganye uses stories told by her aunt and her grandmother, defined by the artists as “the keepers of light” to create the photographic arrangements. In Mohlokomedi wa Tora, Kganye highlights her matrilineal linage and the women in her family as keepers of memories. As the artist explains, the work aims to stress the power of oral stories to shape vivid and collective imaginaries.

Solo exhibitions 

 The Stories We Tell, George Bizos Gallery at Apartheid Museum, Johannesburg, 2020
 Camera Austria Award for Contemporary Photography, Lebohang Kganye, Award Ceremony, Graz, 2019.
 a ppr oc he: Lebohang Kganye, Le Molière, Paris, 2019
 Mohlokomedi wa Tora, Pretoria Art Museum, Pretoria, South Africa, 2018
 Tell Tale, The Photo Workshop Gallery, Johannesburg, 2018
 Festival Africolor, Université Paris 13, Paris, 2016
 Focus: African Perspectives, Armory Show, Afronova Gallery, New York, 2016
 Ke Lefa Laka, Market Photo Workshop Gallery, Johannesburg, 2013

Group exhibitions 

 The Power Of My Hands, Museum of Modern Art, Paris, 2020
 Imagens Resolutivas, FIF_BH – International Festival of Photography of Belo Horizonte, Brazil, 2020
 Paulo Cunha e Silva Art Prize Exhibition, Porto, Portugal, 2020
 Home, Paper Biennale, Museum Rijswijk, Rijswijk, Netherlands, 2020
 APhF – Athens Photo Festival, Athens, 2020
 Unexpected, Festival Images Vevey, Vevey, Switzerland, 2020
 BLANKSPACE: Home as a Parish, Hangar Online (digital), 2020
 Afterglow, Yokohama Triennale, Yokohama Museum of Art, Japan, 2020
 Alpha Crucis – Contemporary African Art, Astrup Fearnley Museet, Oslo, Norway, 2020
 Crossing Night: Regional Identities x Global Context, MOCAD, Detroit USA, 2019–2020
 Africa State of Mind, Royal West of England Academy, Bristol UK, 2019–2020
 The Way She Looks: A History of Female Gazes in African Portraiture, Ryerson Image Centre, Toronto, 2019
 Africa State of Mind, Museum of the African Diaspora, San Francisco, 2019
 Coda Paper Art 2019, Coda Paper Museum, Apeldoorn, the Netherlands, 2019
 Beyond Boundaries: LensCulture Discoveries in Contemporary Photography, Aperture Gallery, New York, 2019
 Who's Looking at the Family, Now?, Photo50 at London Art Fair, London, UK, 2019
 Sans Tambour, Ni Trompette, Cent ans de Guerres, Faux Mouvement, Metz, France, 2018–2019
 Remembrance, Rose Gallery, Santa Monica, 2018
 Africa State of Mind, Impressions Gallery, Bradford UK, 2018
 The Bricks that Build a Home, The Migratie Museum, The Hague, The Netherlands, 2018
 Gifts, 25 years of Open Society Foundation, Open Society Foundation, Cape Town, 2018–2020
 Recent Histories, Contemporary African Photography and Video Art from The Walther Collection, Huis Marseille, Museum for Photography, Amsterdam, NL, 2018–2019
 L’Afrique n’est pas une île, Fondation Zinsou, Cotonou, Benin, 2018–2019
 Un Air de famille – parce que les fantômes disparaissent au lever du jour, H2M, Bourg-en-Bresse, France, 2018 - 2019
 Not the Usual Suspects, IZIKO South African National Gallery, Cape Town, 2018–2019
 ReCreation, Non-Work: Occupied by Leisure Time, Fotograf Festival #8, Fotograf Gallery, Prague, Czech Republic, 2018
 17th DongGang International Photo Festival 2018, Gangwon-do, Yeongwol-gun, Korea, 2018                                                                                                        
 Africa is No Island, MACAAL, Marrakech, 2018
 Tell freedom, by all means necessary, Kunsthal KAdE, Amersfoort, The Netherlands, 2018
 Sans tambour ni trompette – Cent ans de guerres, Le Parvis centre d'art, Parvis, France, 2017–2018
 RESIST(E) – Printemps photographique Afrique de Sud, NegPos, France, 2017–2018
 Digital Africa (Tokyo), YaPhoto@Arakawa Africa, OGU MAG gallery, Tokyo, 2017
 Recent Histories, New Photography from Africa, Walther Collection, Ulm, 2017
 Les Territoires du Corps, Video Programme, Art Paris Art Fair, Grand Palais, Paris, 2017
 Le jour qui vient, AFRICA NOW, Galerie des Galeries, Galeries Lafayette, Paris, 2017
 Give me Yesterday, Fondazione Prada Osservatorio, Milan, 2016
 In Plain Sight: Social Life in South Africa and Romania beforeand after 1989, Aparte Gallery of George Enescu University of Arts, Iasi & Borderline Art Space, Iasi, 2016 
 Recent Histories, New Photography from Africa, Walther Collection Project Space, New York, 2016
 L’Autre Continent, Artistes, Femmes, Africaines, Le Havre, 2016
 Cities and Memory, Photo Biennale, Brandts Museum, Odense, 2016
 Telling Time, Bamako Encounters Biennale of African Photography, Bamako, 2015
 The View From Here, Tiwani Contemporary, London, 2015
 OFF THE WALL, Les Rencontres d’Arles, Arles, 2014
 Apartheid and After, Huis Marseille, Amsterdam, 2013
 Photoville, Brooklyn Bridge Park, New York, 2013
 Short Change, My Joburg, La Maison Rouge Gallery, Paris, 2013
 Rememory, William Goodenough House, London, 2012

Awards 

 Camera Austria Award, Winner, 2019
 Rolex Mentor and Protégé Arts Initiative, Visual Arts Finalist, 2020
 Tokyo International Photography Competition 6th edition, Winner, 2019
 Paulo Cunha e Silva Art Prize, Winner, 2019
 Art Photography Awards 2018, LensCulture, Juror's Pick, 2018
 Sasol New Signatures Award, Winner, 2017
 CAP Prize Recipient, Image Afrique Festival, 2017
 SA Taxi Foundation Art Award, Top 5, Multiples, Lizamore and Gallery, 2017

Collections 

Kganye's work is held in the following permanent collections:

 Walther Collection, New York
 National Museum of Mali, Bamako
 Carnegie Museum of Art, Pennsylvania
 Chazen Museum of Art, Wisconsin
 JP Morgan, Johannesburg/ New York
 Fondation Francès, France
 The Jean Pigozzi Collection (CAAC), Geneva

Publications 

 Unexpected. Le hasard des choses, Festival Images Vevey catalogue, 2020 (Soft Cover)
 Thuis/Home – PAPIER BIËNNALE/PAPER BIENNIAL, 2020 (Soft Cover)
 Issue 30, The Hand Magazine #30, 2020 (Soft Cover)
 Africa State of Mind: Contemporary Photography Reimagines a Continent, Thames & Hudson, 2020 (hard cover)
 ZUM, #18, Revista de fotografia, Photography magazine, 2020 (Soft Cover)
 The Journey | New Positions in African Photography, Kerber, 2020 (soft cover)
 Objective #20, Objective Press, Oslo, 2019
 Tell Freedom, Kunsthal kAde Amersfoort, 2018 (soft cover)
 144/2018 Camera Austria International, Camera Austria, 2018 (soft cover)
 Being a Photographer in Africa, the ten years of Afrique in Visu, Éditions Clémentine de la Féronnière, 2017 (hard cover)
 35 Years: Trailblazers, Lizamore and Gallery, Catalogue, 2017 (soft cover)
 Sasol New Signatures, Catalogue, 2017 (soft cover)
 Recent Histories: Contemporary African Photography and Video Art from the Walther Collection, Steidl / The Walther Collection, 2017 (hard cover)
 Platform Africa, Aperture Magazine #227, 2017 (soft cover)
 ELSE Publication, Musée de l’Elysée Lausanne, 2016 (soft cover)
 L’autre Continent Publication, Muséum du Havre, 2016 (hard cover)
 Telling Time, Bamako Encounters Biennale Publication, Kehrer Verlag, 2015 (hard cover)
 Eyes on, Eyes from Africa, Book on emerging photography, OFF the Wall Editions, 2015 (soft cover)
 My Joburg Publication, Fage, 2014 (soft cover)
 Ke Lefa Laka, Tierney Fellowship Publication, Market Photo Workshop, 2013 (soft cover)
 Apartheid and After Publication, Huis Marseille, 2013 (hard cover)

References

External links 

 Artist CV 
 Afronova Gallery

1990 births
People from Katlehong
21st-century South African artists
University of the Witwatersrand alumni
Living people